EPSILON is a macro language with high level features including strings and lists, developed by A.P. Ershov at Novosibirsk in 1967. EPSILON was used to implement ALGOL 68 on the M-220 computer.

See also 
 "Application of the Machine-Oriented Language Epsilon to Software Development", I.V. Pottosin et al., in Machine Oriented Higher Level Languages, W. van der Poel, N-H 1974, pp. 417–434
 FOLDOC - http://foldoc.org/EPSILON

ALGOL 68 dialect